CCGS Kopit Hopson 1752, formerly CCGS Edward Cornwallis, is a  of the Canadian Coast Guard.  She serves as a light Icebreaker and buoy tender on the East Coast of Canada. Entering service in 1986, the vessel is homeported at Dartmouth, Nova Scotia. The vessel was originally named after Lieutenant General Edward Cornwallis, a British Army officer and founding governor of Halifax, Nova Scotia. Due to the controversial history of the vessel's initial namesake, the ship was renamed in consultation with indigenous peoples, to commemorate Jean-Baptiste Cope under his Mi'kmaq name, British Governor Peregrine Hopson, and the year of the peace and friendship treaty created by former Governor Edward Cornwallis.

Design and description
Kopit Hopson 1752 and sister ship  differ from the rest of the class by having one less deck in the superstructure and their buoy-handling derricks mounted forward.

The vessel is powered by is propelled by two fixed-pitch propellers and bow thrusters powered by three Alco 251F diesel-electric engines creating  and three Canadian GE generators producing 6 megawatts of AC power driving two Canadian GE motors creating . The ship is also equipped with one Caterpillar 3306 emergency generator, and one Caterpillar 3508 auxiliary generator. The ship is certified as Arctic Class 2.

The icebreaker is equipped with one Racal Decca Bridgemaster navigational radar operating on the I band. The vessel is equipped a  cargo hold. Kopit Hopson 1752 has a flight deck and hangar which originally housed light helicopters of the MBB Bo 105 or Bell 206L types, but in the 2010s, the Bell 429 GlobalRanger and Bell 412EPI were acquired by the Canadian Coast Guard to replace the older helicopters. The ship has a complement of 25, with 10 officers and 15 crew. Kopit Hopson 1752 has 9 additional berths.

Operational history
The ship was constructed by Marine Industries at their yard in Tracy, Quebec, with the yard number 450. Edward Cornwallis was launched on 24 February 1986 and entered service on 14 August 1986.  The ship is registered in Ottawa, Ontario, and homeported at Dartmouth, Nova Scotia.

On 17 December 2007, Edward Cornwallis was dispatched to recover the  barge Houston  carrying diesel fuel that had cast adrift in St. George's Bay near Port Hood, Nova Scotia. Facing  winds and  waves, members of the crew boarded the barge. They rescued the crew and kept the barge from going aground until a tugboat arrived on 19 December. Five members of the crew were later awarded medals for their efforts.

On 2 March 2020, Shelburne Ship Repair was awarded a  contract to refit Edward Cornwallis at their yard in Shelburne, Nova Scotia. Work was expected to begin in April and last until January 2021.

Renaming
Due to the controversial history of the ship's original namesake, the ship was pending a rename by the Mi'kmaq. The Halifax Shipping News reported on 31 March 2021 that the Canadian Coast Guard vessel formerly known as Edward Cornwallis, had been re-registered as CCGS Kopit Hopson 1752. The new name was chosen in consultation with indigenous peoples and recognizes Jean-Baptiste Cope under his Mi'kmaq name, British Governor Peregrine Hopson, and the year of the peace and friendship treaty created by former Governor Edward Cornwallis.

References

Notes

Citations

Sources

External links

 CCGS Edward Cornwallis

Martha L. Black-class icebreakers
Ships built in Quebec
1986 ships